Bright Haines Glade Branch is a  long third-order tributary to Prospect Branch in Kent County, Delaware.  This is the only stream of this name in the United States.

Course
Bright Haines Glade Branch rises on the Browns Branch divide about 0.5 miles southwest of Harrington, Delaware, and then flows southwest to join Prospect Branch about 1-mile southeast of Vernon, Delaware.

Watershed
Bright Haines Glade Branch drains  of area, receives about 45.2 in/year of precipitation, and is about 8.88% forested.

See also
List of rivers of Delaware

References

Rivers of Delaware
Rivers of Kent County, Delaware